HammondCare is a not-for-profit independent Christian charity that provides aged care and health services including residential care, home care, community health and hospital care.

History 
HammondCare was established in1932 during the Great Depression when thousands of poverty-stricken rent-paying families were evicted from their inner-Sydney homes. In response to this crisis Anglican Archdeacon Robert Brodribb Hammond (also known as Rev Bob Hammond) used his own funds to purchase land near Liverpool which was later named as Hammondville. Families who were homeless or facing homelessness from eviction were offered an opportunity to rent-purchase a home on this pioneer settlement, providing them with stability and independence through home ownership. The work of Bob Hammond was the birth of the charitable organisation now known as HammondCare.

In 1995, HammondCare opened its first small household or cottage dementia care home and also founded the Dementia Centre in Australia (and more recently in the UK) as a provider of dementia-related research, development and support services. 1995 also saw the appointment of Stephen Judd as CEO.

HammondCare Head Office is located in St Leonards, NSW with local offices located with residential care homes and other health, aged and dementia care services throughout Australia.

In 2021 HammondCare partnered with Coles Supermarkets to build mini, dementia-friendly supermarkets within their care homes nationally.

The University of Sydney announced partnership with HammondCare in March 2022 to shape the sector through collaboration on research, education and social impact.

Services 

 Residential Aged Care
 Home Care
 Healthcare and Hospitals
 The Dementia Centre and Dementia Support Australia
 Rehabilition
 Palliative Care

References 

Christian charities
Organizations established in 1932